Pahaquarry Township is a now-defunct township that was located in Warren County, New Jersey, United States, from 1824 until it was dissolved in 1997.

History

Pahaquarry Township was formed on December 27, 1824, from portions of Walpack Township in Sussex County and set off to Warren County.

The township got its name from the word Pahaquarra, which was a derivation of the Native American word Pahaqualong, which meant "the place between the mountains beside the waters".

Opened in the 1750s, the Pahaquarry Copper Mine was active from the 18th to early-20th centuries, until its closure in 1928. Despite developments in mining technology and improving mineral extraction methods, the mine remained unsuccessful and unprofitable, as the ore extracted proved to be of too low a concentration of copper.

Millbrook Village, located along the historic Old Mine Road in Pahaquarry, was home to the Van Campen family farmsteads built during the late-18th and 19th-centuries. In 1832, Abram Garis built a grist mill along Van Campen brook. The mill soon attracted other businesses and by the 1870s, Millbrook was a thriving farm village. However, by 1910, the mill, store and hotel closed their doors. The area is now part of the Delaware Water Gap National Recreation Area, and located within the Old Mine Road Historic District. Today, only a handful of original Millbrook buildings remain. Other buildings have been moved from other sites or are newly built to help depict village life in the valley during the late-19th and early-20th century. Several buildings are open to the public on summer weekends.

The Calno School was established in 1870, rebuilt in 1910, and active until the 1940, for schoolchildren of Pahaquarry.  By 1881, the Calno school district counted 48 school-age pupils. Only 30 were on the school's register, though, and daily attendance averaged only 15. Teachers, who were paid poorly, boarded with local families and seldom stayed more than a year or two. Most students traveled to school on foot, and schools were placed so that students would not have to walk more than four to five miles. The Millbrook School, located 5 miles north in Millbrook Village, was used to teach Pahaquarry children, as well.

Pahaquarry sits on the Delaware River.  Most of its land was purchased by the federal government during the late 1960s in order to build the proposed Tocks Island Dam along the river, and its population was reduced to only a handful of people.  Grassroot environmental organizations and mass local opposition put a halt to these plans and the dam was never completed.  Most of the land became part of Delaware Water Gap National Recreation Area.  The project was officially deauthorized by Congress during 1992.

National attention was brought to Pahaquarry Township following a New York Times article published in April 1997. Mayor Jean Zipser and Harold Van Campen, the only members of the Township Committee, met inside the Calno School and voted 2-0 to permit the dissolution to proceed in March 1997.

On July 2, 1997, Pahaquarry Township, whose population had dwindled to 6 people, was dissolved and incorporated into Hardwick Township.

Demographics

As of the 1990 United States census (the last census for which the Township existed), there were 20 people, 9 households, and 5 families residing in the township.  The racial makeup of the borough was 100.00% White (20 Whites). 5.00% of the population was Hispanic or Latino of any race (1 Hispanic or Latino).

In the township, the population was spread out, with 15.0% under the age of 18, 10.0% from 18 to 24, 20.0% from 25 to 44, 30.0% from 45 to 64, and 25.0% who were 65 years of age or older. The median age was 38 years.

Popular Culture
 Pittsburgh indie rock band Vehicle Flips released a song titled "Song for Pahaquarry, NJ (1824-1997)" on their 2000 album For You I Pine, reflecting on the fate of the town.

See also
 Minisink
 Pahaquarry Copper Mine
 Millbrook Village
 Old Mine Road Historic District
 Tocks Island Dam Controversy
 Yards Creek Generating Station

References

1824 establishments in New Jersey
1997 disestablishments in New Jersey
Delaware Water Gap National Recreation Area
Former municipalities in Warren County, New Jersey
Former townships in New Jersey
Ghost towns in New Jersey
Hardwick Township, New Jersey
Populated places disestablished in 1997
Populated places established in 1824